Ijeoma is a Igbo name common in Nigeria. The name means "Safe journey".

Notable people with Ijeoma as their first name 

 Ije Akunyili, American medical practitioner
 Ijeoma Grace Agu, Nigerian actress
 Ijeoma Ndukwe-Egwuronu, Nigerian entrepreneur
 Ijeoma Nwaogwugwu, Nigerian journalist
 Ijeoma Oluo, American writer
 Ijeoma Uchegbu, Nigerian-British pharmacist and Professor of Pharmacy
 Ijeoma Umebinyuo, Nigerian poet

References 

Igbo given names